Greg Hetherington (born May 10, 1983) is a former Canadian football slotback. He most recently played for the BC Lions of the Canadian Football League. He was drafted by the Calgary Stampeders in the sixth round of the 2007 CFL Draft. He played CIS Football for the McGill Redmen.

Further reading

External links
BC Lions bio

1983 births
Living people
Canadian football slotbacks
McGill Redbirds football players
Calgary Stampeders players
BC Lions players
Players of Canadian football from Ontario
Canadian football people from Toronto